Oliver Ross may refer to:

Oliver Ross (footballer) (born 2004), Danish footballer
Oliver Ross (offensive lineman) (born 1974), American football player
Oliver Ross (running back) (born 1949), American football player